The Mathematical Intelligencer is a mathematical journal published by Springer Verlag that aims at a conversational and scholarly tone, rather than the technical and specialist tone more common among academic journals. Volumes are released quarterly with a subset of open access articles. Springer also cross-publishes some of the articles in Scientific American. Karen Parshall and Sergei Tabachnikov are  currently the co-editors-in-chief.

History
The journal was started informally in 1971 by Walter Kaufman-Buehler, Alice Peters and Klaus Peters. "Intelligencer" was chosen by Kaufman-Buehler as a word that would appear slightly old-fashioned. An exploration of mathematically themed stamps, written by Robin Wilson, became one of its earliest columns. In 1978, the founders appointed Bruce Chandler and Harold "Ed" Edwards Jr. to serve jointly in the role of editor-in-chief. Prior to 1978, articles of the Intelligencer were not contained in regular volumes and were sent out sporadically to those on a mailing list. To gauge interest, the inaugural mailing included twelve thousand people of whom four thousand requested further copies via postcard. One of the latter was André Weil, who mocked the mailing’s admittedly idiosyncratic typography. Articles from this period have been retroactively collected in "Volume 0".

Subsequent editors-in-chief were John Ewing from 1979 to 1986, Sheldon Axler from 1987 to 1991 and Chandler Davis from 1991 to 2004. Beginning in 2004, Davis shared editing responsibilities with long-time Intelligencer contributor Marjorie Senechal. She became the sole editor on Davis’s retirement in 2013 and continued to edit the journal through the end of 2020. Parshall and Tabachnikov took over from her in 2021.

Almost from the beginning, the journal’s editors have shown a “willingness to deal with controversial topics.” For example, Chandler and Edwards excerpted Morris Kline’s controversial 1977 book, Why the Professor Can’t Teach, prompting numerous reactions.  Their successor, Ewing, acknowledged that “the purpose of the Intelligencer remains the same: to inform, to entertain, and to provoke."  Axler was even more categorical: “Controversies can make for interesting reading, especially in mathematics where we rarely argue about the scientific validity of a result. … [They] keep the publication edgy.”   Indeed, Axler identified at least three controversies that erupted during his editorship.  One was a book review by Steven Krantz in 1989 which expanded to criticize research interest in fractals; "Fractal geometry has not solved any problems. It is not even clear that it has created any new ones." This prompted Benoit Mandelbrot to publish a rebuttal in the same journal. The rebuttal format was initially planned for a paper accepted by Senechal that was authored by Theodore Hill and Sergei Tabachnikov on the variability hypothesis.  In the end, however, it was not published. Further controversy arose when a revised version of the paper, by Hill alone, was published by The New York Journal of Mathematics but then retracted without a notice.

Contents
The Mathematical Intelligencer publishes a variety of contributions on and about mathematics. In addition to articles of a strictly mathematical nature, shorter “notes,” poetry, short fiction, and the occasional interview, the journal currently features regular columns on the history of mathematics (“Years Ago” overseen by Jemma Lorenat), humor (“Mathematically Bent” written by Colin Adams), “Mathematical Gems and Curiosities” (edited by Valentin Ovsienko and Sophie Morier-Genoud), “Mathematical Communities” (edited by Marjorie Senechal), “The Mathematical Tourist” (edited by Ma. Louise Antonette De Las Peñas), and mathematically themed stamps (“Stamp Corner” edited by Robin Wilson).  Long-time contributor, Jim Henle also authored a column on “Cucina Matematica” until 2015 as well as, most recently, one “For Our Mathematical Pleasure.” Under Osmo Pekonen, the book review section covers books, both non-fiction and fiction, of interest to the mathematically inclined.

Reception
The Mathematical Intelligencer has been described as a journal that publishes articles about front-line research rather than research per se. In 2001, Branislav Kisacanin opined that it belongs in "every good mathematics library". Apart from the Intelligencer's main articles, a humor column written by mathematician Colin Adams has also been well received.

Reception is also suggested by the fact that, in 2019 and 2020, for example, the journal's authors hailed from East and South-East Asia (China, Japan, Hong Kong, Mongolia, the Philippines, Vietnam), South Asia (India, Bangladesh), the Middle East (Israel, Egypt, Jordan, Iraq, Iran), Europe (Belgium, Croatia, the Czech Republic, Finland, France, Germany, Hungary, Ireland, Italy, the Netherlands, Poland, Slovakia, Spain, Sweden, the United Kingdom), North America (Canada, the United States), and South America (Argentina, Brazil).

References

External links
 Home page for Mathematical Intelligencer at Springer Verlag

Mathematics journals
Springer Science+Business Media academic journals